The Knoxville Ladies Classic was a golf tournament on the LPGA Tour, played only in 1972. It was played at the Deane Hill Country Club in Knoxville, Tennessee. Kathy Whitworth won the event by four strokes over Sandra Haynie.

References

Former LPGA Tour events
Golf in Tennessee
Sports in Knoxville, Tennessee
History of women in Tennessee
1972 in Tennessee